Hanami is a surname. Notable people with the surname include: 

Clement Hanami, Japanese-American artist
Ren Hanami, American actress, writer, director and singer

Japanese-language surnames